Side Chick Gang is a 2018 Ghanaian drama/comedy movie directed by Peter Sedufia.

Synopsis 
Three female friends who quit their real jobs as ushers to pursue a job which pays more and better than their old jobs they set up "sidechic gang". Sidechic gang only provides services to women. This makes the men very unhappy with the sudden popularity of their exposè. The job assigns them to clamp down on husbands or  boyfriends who are cheating on their wives or girlfriends. The gang takes on a job from a rich man which is their biggest deal on his suspected cheating fiancee. The greatest of their opposition is the aggrieved men who benefited from the services of side chicks.

Cast
Nana Ama McBrown 
Lydia Forson
Adjetey Anang
Bernard Nyarko
Sika Osei
Adjetey Anang 
Eddie Kufour
Akofa Edjeane

Nominations 

 Africa Movie Academy Awards for Best Director (2018)
 Africa Movie Academy awards for Best Film (2018)
 Africa Movie Academy Award for Best Comedy (2018)
 Africa Movie Academy Award for Best Achievement In Sound (2018)
 Africa Movie Academy Award for Best Actress In Leading Role (2018)

References 

2018 films
Ghanaian comedy-drama films
English-language Ghanaian films
2010s English-language films